European route E40 is the longest European route, more than  long, connecting Calais in France via Belgium, Germany, Poland, Ukraine, Russia, Kazakhstan, Uzbekistan, Turkmenistan, and Kyrgyzstan, with Ridder in Kazakhstan near the border with Russia and China.

A different route connecting Calais and Ridder is about  shorter, mostly using the E30 via Berlin-Moscow-Omsk. The E40 differs from that route in order to provide additional direct east-west access to Uzbekistan, Turkmenistan, and Kyrgyzstan, which have a combined population base approaching 50 million people as of 2021.

Route

France 
: Calais (E15 / E402) - Dunkirk - Ghyvelde

Belgium 
: Adinkerke - Veurne - Jabbeke (E404)
: Jabbeke (E404) - Bruges (E403) - Gent (E17) - Brussels (E19)
: Brussels (E19 Towards E411)
: Brussels - Leuven (E314) - Liège (E25 / E42 / E313, Towards E46) - Verviers (E42) - Lichtenbusch (E421)

Germany 
: Aachen (E 314)
: Aachen (E 314) - Cologne (E 31 / E 35, Towards E 29 / E 37) - Olpe (E 41)
: Olpe (start of concurrency with E 41) - Siegen - Gießen (E 44, end of concurrency with E 41)
: Gießen (E 41 / E 44)
: Gießen
: Gießen (E 451)
: Gießen (E 451) - Bad Hersfeld (E 45)
: Bad Hersfeld (E 45)
: Bad Hersfeld (E 45) - Eisenach - Erfurt - Zwickau (E 49 / E 51 / E 40) - Chemnitz (E 441) - Dresden (E 55) - Görlitz

Poland 
: Zgorzelec - Bolesławiec (E36) - Legnica (E65) - Wrocław (E67 ) - Opole - Gliwice  - Katowice - Mysłowice (E75, start of concurrency with E462) - Kraków (E77, end of concurrency with E462) - Rzeszów (E371) - Korczowa

Ukraine 

: Krakivets - Lviv
: Lviv - Dubno (E85) - Rivne - Zhytomyr (E583) - Kyiv (E95 / E101)
: Kyiv (E95 / E101) - Lubny - Poltava (E584) - Kharkiv (E105) - Sloviansk - Debaltseve (E50)
: Debaltseve (E50) - Luhansk - Izvaryne

Russia 
 (formerly M21): Donetsk - Kamensk-Shakhtinsky (E40) - Volgograd (E119)
 (formerly M6): Volgograd (start of concurrency with E119) - Astrakhan (end of concurrency E119)
12A-235: Astrakhan - Krasny Yar

Kazakhstan (west) 
: Kotyaevka - Atyrau (start of concurrency with E121) - Dossor
: Dossor - Beyneu (end of concurrency with E121)
: Beyneu (E121) - Akjigit - Border with Uzbekistan

Uzbekistan (west) 
 A380 Road: Border with Kazakhstan - Karakalpakstan - Qo'ng'irot - Xojeli - Nukus
 A381 Road: Xojeli - Border with Turkmenistan

Turkmenistan 
Border with Uzbekistan - Konye-Urgench - Daşoguz

Uzbekistan (east) 
 4P159 Road: Border with Turkmenistan - Shovot - Urgench
 4P156 Road: Urgench - Hazorasp - 
 A380 Road:  - Bukhara 
 M37 Road: Bukhara - Navoiy - Samarqand
 M39 Road: Samarkand - Jizzax - Sardoba
 A373 Road: Sardoba - Oqoltin 
 M34 Road: Oqoltin - Sirdaryo 
 M39 Road: Sirdaryo (start of concurrency with E123) - Chinoz - Tashkent -G‘ishtko‘prik - Border of Kazakhstan

Kazakhstan (middle) 
: Zhibek Zholy - Shymkent (end of concurrency with E123) - Taraz - Merki
: Merki - Chaldovar

Kyrgyzstan 
  ЭМ-03 Road: Border of Kazakhstan - Chaldovar - Kara-Balta 
  ЭМ-04 Road: Kara-Balta - Bishkek (Start of Concurrency with )
  ЭМ-02 Road: Bishkek Bypass
  ЭМ-01 Road: Bishkek - Border of Kazakhstan

Kazakhstan (east) 
: Korday - Almaty (E012, end of concurrency with E125)
: Almaty (E125 / E012) - Sary-Ozek (E013) - Taldykorgan - Usharal (E014) - Ayagoz - Qalbatau (E127) - Öskemen
: Öskemen - Sekisovka
: Sekisovka - Ridder

Gallery

Notes

References

External links 

 UN Economic Commission for Europe: Overall Map of E-road Network (2007)
 The E40 as a Path of Remembrance in Europe

 
E040
European routes in Ukraine
E40
E040
E040
E040
E040
E040
E040
E040
E040
E040
E040
40